Sèvres–Babylone is a station on Line 10 and Line 12 of the Paris Métro. It is located at the intersection of Boulevard Raspail and the Rue de Sèvres, on the border of the 6th and 7th arrondissements. The Rue de Sèvres boasts two flagship Paris fashion stores: Le Bon Marché at number 22 and Hermès at number 17.

History
The Line 12 platforms opened as Sèvres–Croix-Rouge on 5 November 1910 as part of the original section of the Nord-Sud Company's Line A between Porte de Versailles and Notre-Dame-de-Lorette. On 27 March 1931, Line A became Line 12 of the Métro network. The station was named after the Rue de Sèvres, which in medieval times ran from Paris to Sèvres.

The Line 10 station was opened by the Compagnie du chemin de fer métropolitain de Paris on 30 December 1923 as part of the first section of the Ligne circulaire intérieure (inner circular line) from Invalides (now on Line 13) to Croix-Rouge (a station east of Sèvres–Babylone, which was closed during World War II).

At the start, the Line 10 station was supposed to be named Babylone (in reference to the Rue de Babylone, named in 1673 after the Catholic Bishop of Babylon), while the nearby Line 12 station was still named Sèvres–Croix-Rouge. Shortly before the opening of Line 10, the city forced the two companies to form a common station, Sèvres–Babylone, but the sign for Line 10 read -Babylone (emphasizing Babylone) and that of Line 12 by contrast read Sèvres- (emphasizing Sèvres).

Station layout

Gallery

References

Roland, Gérard (2003). Stations de métro. D’Abbesses à Wagram. Éditions Bonneton.

Paris Métro stations in the 7th arrondissement of Paris
Paris Métro stations in the 6th arrondissement of Paris
Railway stations in France opened in 1910
Articles containing video clips